Ilias Ali may refer to:

 Ilias Ali (Bangladeshi politician) (1961–2012), Bangladeshi politician 
 Ilias Ali (Indian politician) (born 1960), Indian politician
 Ilias Ali (figure skater) (born 1994), Kazakhstani former ice dancer
 Ilias Ali (surgeon) (born 1955), Indian surgeon